Tepidamorphus gemmatus is a slightly thermophilic, Gram-negative and rod-shaped bacterium species from the genus of Tepidamorphus which has been isolated from a hot spring from the Furnas area on the São Miguel Island on the Azores.

References

Further reading

External links 
Type strain of Tepidamorphus gemmatus at BacDive -  the Bacterial Diversity Metadatabase

Hyphomicrobiales
Bacteria described in 2010